The second season of The Cleveland Show aired from September 26, 2010, to May 15, 2011. Fox ordered a second production series of 22 episodes (2APSxx) in October 2009.

Cast

This season included the return of Kanye West for an additional episode after he appeared in the first season episode "Brotherly Love". The article has The Cleveland Show co-creator Rich Appel stating he hopes there is, even more, to come and then goes on to say "He could not have been more collaborative or easier to work with. We're excited because his character has become a recurring character in our universe… He'll become our Sideshow Bob!".

Episode list

Reception
Unlike the first season, this season received a more positive reception, in comparison to the first season. The Rotten Tomatoes score is a 63%, a 19% improvement over the previous season.

Home media
The DVD was released as a "Complete Season" featuring all of the aired episodes. It was released in Region 1 on September 27, 2011 and was released in Region 2 on January 30, 2012.

References

2
2010 American television seasons
2011 American television seasons